The 1996 Marseille Open was a tennis tournament played on indoor hard courts at the Palais des Sports de Marseille in Marseille in France and was part of the World Series of the 1996 ATP Tour. The tournament ran from February 12 through February 18, 1996.

Finals

Singles

 Guy Forget defeated  Cédric Pioline 7–5, 6–4
 It was Forget's 1st title of the year and the 35th of his career.

Doubles

 Jean-Philippe Fleurian /  Guillaume Raoux defeated  Marius Barnard /  Peter Nyborg 6–3, 6–2
 It was Fleurian's 1st title of the year and the 1st of his career. It was Raoux's 1st title of the year and the 4th of his career.

References

External links
 Official website 
 ATP tournament profile

Marseille Open
Open 13
Marseille Open